Ahiyapur is a small village near Nanauta. Nanauta is a small town in Saharanpur district of Uttar Pradesh, located on State Highway 57 from Saharanpur to New Delhi.

Agriculture is the main source of income for almost all the villagers. Some people have started working in small industries and business in Nanauta..

References 

Villages in Saharanpur district